"Baby's Gotten Good at Goodbye" is a song written by Tony Martin and Troy Martin, and recorded by American country music singer George Strait.  It was released in December 1988 as the first single from the album Beyond the Blue Neon.

Content
The narrator is a man who is learning that his woman has left him and probably for good this time. She didn't shed a single tear as she left and he knows she's perfected goodbye this time.

Critical reception
Kevin John Coyne of Country Universe gave the song an A grade, saying that the single "is so closely associated with my discovery of George Strait’s music and country music as a whole that I can’t separate the experience enough to give 'Baby’s Gotten Good at Goodbye' an objective evaluation."

Chart positions
"Baby's Gotten Good at Goodbye" reached number 1 on the Billboard Hot Country Songs chart.

Year-end charts

Certifications

References

Songs about parting
1988 singles
1988 songs
George Strait songs
Songs written by Tony Martin (songwriter)
Song recordings produced by Jimmy Bowen
Music videos directed by John Lloyd Miller
MCA Records singles